A special election was held in  on August 2, 1798 to fill a vacancy left by the death of Nathan Bryan (DR) on June 4, 1798

Election results

Spaight took his seat December 10, 1798

See also
List of special elections to the United States House of Representatives
 United States House of Representatives elections, 1798 and 1799

References

North Carolina 1798 10
North Carolina 1798 10
1798 10
North Carolina 10
United States House of Representatives 10
United States House of Representatives 1798 10